Gun laws in American Samoa regulate the sale, possession, and use of firearms and ammunition in the unincorporated territory of American Samoa.

Summary table

Licensing process
American Samoa has a very stringent and restrictive licensing process necessary in order to purchase a firearm in American Samoa. A person has to be 21 to get a weapons license along with several other requirements. Open carry is allowed with a weapons license, concealed carry is illegal. A person who wants to obtain a license to possess a firearm must provide genuine reason why the firearm may be required. The applicant must provide signed affidavits testifying to their good character and their stated need for each firearm from the village mayor, county chief and the police. The most commonly accepted reasons for ownership are plantation protection and hunting but ownership for self-defense is not a valid reason for a license to own a gun in American Samoa. The police must approve any transfer of a firearm between persons.

Prohibited firearms and ammunition
All firearms including automatic firearms, semi-automatic rifles, and handguns are prohibited from civilian possession. Civilians can only own 12-gauge, 16-gauge, 20-gauge and .410 shotguns and .22 caliber rifles with a license. They also can only own ammunition for those types of firearms with a license; possession of any other type of ammunition, whether the person has a license or not, is illegal.

References

American Samoa law
American Samoa